The 1932 United States presidential election in Utah took place on November 8, 1932 as part of the 1932 United States presidential election. All contemporary forty-eight states took part, and state voters selected four voters to the Electoral College, who voted for president and vice president.

Utah, like every state west of the Appalachian Mountains, voted for Franklin D. Roosevelt over Herbert Hoover by a substantial margin, giving the first Democratic victory in the state since 1916 when anti-war sentiment had shifted the state to Woodrow Wilson. Utah's swing to the Democrats was 23.19 percentage points, much smaller than the national swing of 35.18 percentage points, as the anti-Catholicism which marred the preceding election was less prevalent among the LDS hierarchy than in the South or the Pacific Northwest. Consequently, for this election Utah voted more Republican than the nation at-large for the first time in twenty years, by a margin of 2.29 points on a two-party basis. Hoover managed to retain pluralities in seven of Utah's twenty-nine counties, although in San Juan County Hoover won by only a solitary vote and in sparsely populated Daggett County by just eleven. This was nonetheless equal with Missouri and behind only Kansas as the most counties in one state west of the Mississippi – in all of which Hoover retained only forty-six counties out of 1,161 – remaining Republican.

Herbert Hoover, who had been elected in a third consecutive Republican landslide in 1928, was to become extremely unpopular by the time he was up for re-election in 1932, owing to unemployment rising to a whopping twenty-five percent and Hoover's Smoot-Hawley Tariff (proposed by long-serving Beehive State Senator Reed Smoot) had cut severely into exports due to retaliatory tariffs from foreign governments.

The Mountain States, including Utah, were even more severely hit by the economic downturn than the national average: Utah's lost consumption between the 1929 crash and the election was about one standard deviation above the national mean. There was also extreme concern over the falling price of silver, of which Utah was a major producer.

Polls
In a poll conducted by the Literary Digest, Hoover was far behind Roosevelt in all western states, whose electoral votes the Republican Party had monopolized during the three preceding elections. Paul Mallon in his "National Whirlgig" two weeks before the election suggested Roosevelt had a "degree of chance" in Utah, but that the Democrats were certain of victory in the nation as a whole.

Results

Results by county

See also
 United States presidential elections in Utah

Notes

References

1932 Utah elections
Utah
1932